The Yazd Solar Power Station is an integrated solar combined cycle (ISCC) power station situated near Yazd, Iran which became operational in 2009, and in 2011 as a solar integrated plant. The plant has a capacity of 467 MW and uses solar energy to augment its steam generation by concentrating solar power technology.

See also

References

External links
Renewable energy organization of Iran

Solar power stations in Iran
Natural gas-fired power stations in Iran
Yazd